The following is a list of managers of IFK Göteborg, with their league match record and major honours. Including the current manager Poya Asbaghi, IFK Göteborg have had 33 managers or caretaker-managers during 41 managerial spells, excluding the first 16 years of the club's history when there was no official manager. The longest-serving manager is Henning Svensson, who made three spells at the club for a total of 8½ seasons.

Erik Hjelm, Holger Hansson, Hans Karlsson, Gunder Bengtsson, Kjell Pettersson and Roger Gustafsson have all made two spells as manager or caretaker-manager at IFK Göteborg, while Jonas Olsson has had two successive spells as manager, one in cooperation with Stefan Rehn and one as the single manager in charge.

The most successful IFK Göteborg manager in terms of trophies won is Roger Gustafsson who won five Swedish Championships and one Svenska Cupen title during his six-year spell at the club. The only two managers to have won a European title with a Swedish club have done so with IFK Göteborg, Sven-Göran Eriksson won one UEFA Cup title and two Svenska Cupen titles during his spell as manager and Gunder Bengtsson won one UEFA Cup title and two Swedish Championships during his two spells.

The period listed for each spell includes only years where the manager was active during the league season. It does not include years where the manager departed before the start or was appointed after the conclusion of the season. The record only includes matches in Svenska Serien, Allsvenskan, Mästerskapsserien and Division 2.

Managers

References 
All sources in  unless otherwise noted.
Books
 
 

Online

 
IFK Goteborg managers
IFK Goteborg managers
IFK Goteborg